Sehradice is a municipality and village in Zlín District in the Zlín Region of the Czech Republic. It has about 700 inhabitants.

Notable people
Julius Brammer (1877–1943),  Austrian librettist and lyricist

References

Villages in Zlín District